Picoğlu Osman (1901 – 31 May 1946) was a Turkish kemençe player from the Eastern Black Sea Region in Turkey. He was also a famous composer and he is thought to be one of the best kemençe players.

Early life 
He was born in Görele in Northeastern Turkey. His father's name was İsmail and his mother's name was Esma. His mother died in 1905 and his father died in 1912. In 1910, when he was at the age of 9, he began playing kemençe. Another kemençe player Kodalak Halil Agha taught him how to play kemençe. Then he attended traditional festivals and weddings and performed famous kemençe türküs.

Osman as a virtuoso 
Osman was thought to be a very talented player because of his style of play. He worked at TRT Radio in Ankara for four months. He recorded songs on 78 rpm vinyls. His records include:
"Gireson Eşref bey şarkısı"
"Trabzon Kahya Şarkısı"
"Gireson karşılaması (Karşılama)"
"Trabzon Şarkısı (Fadime)"
"Geminin İçineyum"
"Romiko" (Gireson Milli Şarkısı)
"Tamzara Havası"
"Trabzon Sıksara Horon Havası"
"Giresun Üstünde Vapur Bağırıyor"
"Anlamıyorsun Beni" or (TRT: "Anam vay olsun beni")

During Mustafa Kemal Atatürk's visit to Trabzon, Picoğlu played kemençe in front of the president.

He influenced a lot of kemençe players who are now among the best. Mehmet Sırrı Öztürk is an important kemençe player who is influenced by Picoğlu.

Death 
He was on board of a ship which sailed to Istanbul when he died. His cause of death is not exactly known but it is thought to be tuberculosis or cirrhosis.

Photos

Notes

References 

1901 births
1946 deaths
People from Görele
People from Trebizond vilayet
Turkish folk musicians
Kemençe players
20th-century violinists
20th-century deaths from tuberculosis
Tuberculosis deaths in Turkey
Alcohol-related deaths in Turkey